The discography of Mary Ann Acevedo, a Puerto Rican singer-songwriter, actress and musician, contains three studio albums, five singles, three promotional singles, and six music videos.

Albums

Studio albums

Collaborations

Singles

Promotional singles

Other projects
 Songs written and co-written by Mary Ann Acevedo.

Music videos

References

Pop music discographies
Discographies of American artists